Yakty-Kul (Yaqtıkül) is a rural locality (a village) in Tashbulatovsky Selsoviet, Abzelilovsky District, Bashkortostan, Russia. The population was 418 as of 2010. There are 13 streets.

Geography 
Yakty-Kul is located 38 km north of Askarovo (the district's administrative centre) by road. Zelyonaya Polyana is the nearest rural locality.

References 

Rural localities in Abzelilovsky District